The Western Cape province of South Africa is divided, for local government purposes, into one metropolitan municipality (the City of Cape Town) and five district municipalities. The district municipalities are in turn divided into twenty-four local municipalities.

In the following interactive map, the district and metropolitan municipalities are labelled in capital letters and shaded in various different colours. 
Clicking on the district on the map loads the appropriate article:

District and metropolitan municipalities

Local and metropolitan municipalities

References

 
Western Cape
Western Cape-related lists